Felicidades ( - international title: Merry Christmas) is a 2000 Argentine-Italian comedy-drama film written and directed by Lucho Bender and starring Gastón Pauls, Pablo Cedrón, Silke, Luis Machín, Carlos Belloso and Alfredo Casero. It was premiered at the Venice Film Festival in Italy on September 5 and in Argentina on September 7, 2000.

The picture was Argentina's official submission for the 73rd Academy Awards and won two Silver Condor Awards whilst being nominated for nine different categories. Lucho Bender won Best First Film.

Cast
 Luis Machín as Juan
 Gastón Pauls as Julio
 Silke as Laura
 Pablo Cedrón as Rodolfo
 Carlos Belloso as Comedian
 Alfredo Casero as Fredi
 Marcelo Mazzarello as Paralytic
 Cacho Castaña as Cueto
 Fabián Arenillas as Aguilera
 Eduardo Ayala as Starosta
 Federico Cammarota as Old man
 Fatty Iastrebner as Emilio
 Mariana Arias as Party Woman
 Henry Meziat as Party man
 Mariano Fraomeni as Fredi's neighbour
 Mariana Otero as Salesgirl
 Catalina Speroni as Street neighbour
 Anahí Martella as Street neighbour
 Jorge Román as Nursery man
 Luciano Cazaux as Doctor

See also
 List of Christmas films

External links
 .

2000 films
2000s Christmas comedy-drama films
Argentine comedy-drama films
Argentine independent films
2000s Spanish-language films
Italian independent films
Argentine Christmas films
Italian Christmas comedy-drama films
2000 independent films
2000s Argentine films